Alberta Nichols (December 3, 1898 – February 4, 1957) was a popular songwriter of the 1930s and 1940s. Together with her husband, lyricist Mann Holiner, they composed over 100 songs, of which their most famous were "Until the Real Thing Comes Along" and "A Love Like Ours".

Biography

Nichols was born in Lincoln, Illinois on December 3, 1898 and studied piano at the Louisville Conservatory with George Copeland and Alfred Calzin. Her career spanned writing for vaudeville, radio, musical theater and the movies. In 1931 Nichols and Holiner collaborated with Sammy Cahn, Saul Chaplin and L.E. Freeman for the Broadway show "Rhapsody in Black". The group of five also co-wrote "Until the Real Thing Comes Along". Alec Wilder, in American Popular Song, speculates that Nichols was the composer of the melody. Among the many singers who performed the song over the years, Billie Holiday recorded the song in 1942. Holiday was a close friend of the Nichols-Holiners.

Nichols and Holiner wrote the music for several Broadway shows, including "Blackbirds of 1933", and "Angela", which starred Jeanette MacDonald.

Collaborating with Cahn, Chapin and Freeman, the Nichols-Holiners team wrote the music for the film "Rhapsody in Black". "A Love Like Ours" considered by Virginia Grattan to be one of the best songs of the duo, was in the film "Two Girls and a Sailor" starring Van Johnson and June Allyson.

Other songs from the Nichols-Holiner team were: "There Never Was a Town like Paris," "Sing a Little Tune," "You Can't Stop Me from Loving You," and "Why Shouldn't It Happen to Us?" (published in 1945, and recorded by Frank Sinatra)

Alberta Nichols died in Hollywood on February 4, 1957.

Music 
Songs
 "A Love Like Ours" (Two Girls and a Sailor)
"Until the Real Thing Comes Along"
"There Never Was  a Town like Paris"
"Sing a Little Tune"
"You Can't Stop Me from Loving You"
"Why Shouldn't It Happen to Us?"
"I'm Walkin' The Chalk Line"
"Your Mother's Son-In-Law"
"I Just Couldn't Take it Baby"
"Sing a Little Tune"
"I Can't Believe its True" (Angela)
"Maybe So" (Angela)
"The Regal Romp" (Angela)

Broadway Shows that featured Nichols' music
Gay Paree (1926)
Angela
Luckee Girl
Rhapdsody in Black (1931)

Movies that featured Nichols' music
Blackbirds of 1934 (1934)
Two Girls and a Sailor (1944)

References

External links 
 Riverwalk Jazz Notes: A Woman's Touch: America's Unsung Women Composers
 Review of 'Until the Real Thing Comes Along
 Alberta Nichols biographical website with references, song lists, etc. 
 Molly Ruggles singing and accompanying herself playing "Until the Real Thing Comes Along"

1898 births
1957 deaths
American women composers
People from Lincoln, Illinois
Songwriters from Illinois
20th-century American women musicians
20th-century American composers
20th-century women composers